Cryptothecia austrocoreana is a species of crustose and corticolous (bark-dwelling) lichen in the family Arthoniaceae. Found in South Korea, it was formally described as a new species in 2017 by Jung-Jae Woo, László Lőkös, Edit Farkas, and Jae-Seoun Hur. It also grows on the bark of Carpinus tschonoskii. The lichen is only known to occur at the type locality. The specific epithet austrocoreana refers to the southern part of South Korea.

Lichen products found in Cryptothecia austrocoreana include barbatic acid as a major constituent, minor amounts of atranorin, and trace amounts of chloroatranorin. Only six other species of genus Cryptothecia contain barbatic acid.

References

austrocoreana
Lichen species
Lichens described in 2017
Lichens of Asia